Anne+ (also known as Anne+: The Film) is a 2021 Dutch drama film directed by Valerie Bisscheroux. It is a continuation of the popular television series Anne+. The film was released in Dutch cinemas in October 2021 and got a worldwide release on Netflix in February 2022. The film has a role for non-binary actor Thorn Roos de Vries making them the first non-binary actor with a major role in a Dutch film. De Volkskrant gave the film 3 out of 5 stars, saying it felt more like a long television episode than a film. The film played at the 2022 Netherlands Film Festival.

References

External links 
 

2021 films
2020s Dutch-language films
Dutch drama films
Dutch LGBT-related films

Films based on television series